Saint Mary of the Holy Belt (Um Al Zennar) Cathedral (shortened to) is a historical Syriac Orthodox cathedral in Homs, Syria. It is the seat of the Syriac Orthodox Archbishop of Homs and Hama.

The present structure dates from the mid-nineteenth century, but the site over which the church is built is claimed to have been one of Christian worship since 59 AD. According to Ross Burns, the church may rest on Byzantine foundations. According to Joseph Nasrallah, the existence of a church dedicated to Mary in Homs is attested as early as 478.

The church contains a venerated Holy Girdle that is supposed to be a section of the belt of Mary, mother of Jesus.
The church was damaged during confrontations between the armed opposition and the security forces in the 2011–2012 Syrian unrest.

In 2012, reportedly confrontations caused extensive damage to the exterior of the church. The church was rebuilt by an extensive effort of the faithful and the Divine Liturgy was celebrated.

Other relics
This is the Syriac church's equivalent of the Cincture of the Theotokos of the Greek Orthodox Church and Girdle of Thomas of the Catholic Church.

See also
Holy Girdle
Syriac Orthodox Church
Syriac Orthodox Christians

References

External links 
 

59
1st-century churches
Syriac Orthodox churches
Oriental Orthodoxy in Syria
Churches in Syria
Saint Mary